The First Avenue School is a former public school building in the Harrison West neighborhood of Columbus, Ohio. It was listed on the Columbus Register of Historic Properties in 1983, and was listed as part of the Near Northside Historic District, on the National Register of Historic Places, in 1980. The building is one of the oldest in the neighborhood, built in 1874. It is also one of the oldest remaining school buildings in Columbus, built at the same time as the Second Avenue School and Stewart Alternative Elementary, also still extant. In 1984, Wood Development remodeled the building into the First Avenue Office Center at a cost of $1.2 million.

The Italianate structure has segmental arched windows, a wood cornice, hipped roof, and piers on the corner of each projection. The school's main entrance features a round arch with a brick keystone.

See also
 National Register of Historic Places listings in Columbus, Ohio
 Schools in Columbus, Ohio

References

External links
 

1874 establishments in Ohio
Columbus Register properties
Romanesque Revival architecture in Ohio
School buildings completed in 1878
Elementary schools in Ohio
National Register of Historic Places in Columbus, Ohio
School buildings on the National Register of Historic Places in Ohio
Schools in Columbus, Ohio
Historic district contributing properties in Columbus, Ohio